The following are the golfers who have won a PGA Tour event at least five times.

Source:  Official website 
Notability:

Multiple winners
The following golfers have won more than one event at least five times.

7 events
Tiger Woods (WGC-Bridgestone Invitational, WGC-Cadillac Championship, Farmers Insurance Open, Arnold Palmer Invitational, BMW Championship, Memorial Tournament, Masters Tournament)

3 events
Sam Snead (Greater Greensboro Open, Miami Open, Goodall Palm Beach Round Robin)
Jack Nicklaus (Masters Tournament, Tournament of Champions, PGA Championship)

2 events
Walter Hagen (Western Open, PGA Championship)

References

PGA Tour
P